Maryland Route 253 (MD 253) is a state highway in the U.S. state of Maryland. Known as Mayo Road, the route runs  from MD 214 north to MD 2 within Edgewater. MD 253 was constructed in Edgewater in the early 1910s and early 1920s. The highway was extended southeast through Mayo to Beverley Beach in the late 1920s and early 1930s. The part of MD 253 southeast of Edgewater became part of MD 214 in 1950.

Route description

MD 253 begins at an intersection with MD 214 (Central Avenue) across from the entrance to South River High School. The route heads north as a two-lane undivided road that forms the main street through the Londontowne area of Edgewater. The highway intersects Stepneys Lane and Londontown Road; the latter road leads east to the historic London Town Publik House, located next to the landing of a former ferry across South River. After passing Washington Road, which leads east to Edgewater Elementary School and South River Park, the road turns northwest and reaches its northern terminus at MD 2 (Solomons Island Road) across from the entrance to Lee Airport.

History
When the Maryland State Roads Commission laid out its state road system in 1909, the Annapolis–Prince Frederick road was planned to follow Mayo Road and Stepneys Lane through Edgewater to what is now MD 2's existing course. The highway was extended as a gravel road to near the present MD 214 intersection by 1921 and to the entrance to Camp Letts by 1923. MD 253 was extended east to Selby-on-the-Bay in 1929 and 1930. The state highway reached MD 214's present terminus in Beverley Beach in 1932.

MD 214 was extended along a new route from Pike Ridge Road west of MD 2 to MD 253 east of the modern MD 214–MD 253 intersection in 1949. The following year, MD 214 replaced MD 253 on Mayo Road from that junction to Beverley Beach. MD 253's current intersection with MD 214 was built in 1963. The old alignment remained in the state highway system as MD 253A until 2000.

Junction list

Auxiliary route
MD 253A was the designation for a  section of Mayo Road bypassed when MD 253's southern terminus was moved to a new intersection with MD 214 in 1963. MD 253A was removed from the state highway system in 2000. Most of the road was physically removed for the construction of a residential subdivision.

See also

References

External links 

 MDRoads: MD 253

253
Maryland Route 253